Jebel el Gharbi is a mountain in central Lebanon.

References

Mountains of Lebanon